The 2006 Hamburg Sea Devils season was the second season for the franchise in the NFL Europe League (NFLEL). The team was led by head coach Jack Bicknell in his second year, and played its home games at AOL Arena in Hamburg, Germany. They finished the regular season in fifth place with a record of three wins, six losses and one tie.

Offseason

Free agent draft

Personnel

Staff

Roster

Schedule

Standings

Game summaries

Week 1: vs Cologne Centurions

Week 2: at Frankfurt Galaxy

Week 3: vs Berlin Thunder

Week 4: at Rhein Fire

Week 5: vs Frankfurt Galaxy

Week 6: at Cologne Centurions

Week 7: vs Amsterdam Admirals

Week 8: at Berlin Thunder

Week 9: vs Rhein Fire

Week 10: at Amsterdam Admirals

Honors
After the completion of the regular season, the All-NFL Europe League team was selected by the NFLEL coaching staffs, members of a media panel and fans voting online at NFLEurope.com. Overall, Hamburg had three players selected. The selections were:

 Scott McCready, national player
 Rayshun Reed, cornerback
 Scott Scharff, defensive end

Notes

References

Hamburg
Hamburg Sea Devils seasons